The 1972 Utah State Aggies football team represented Utah State University in the 1972 NCAA University Division football season. Led by sixth-year head coach Chuck Mills, the team played its home games at Romney Stadium in Logan, Utah. Competing as an NCAA University Division independent, the team compiled an 8–3 record and finished the season ranked number 17 in the Coaches Poll. This was the last time Utah State finished ranked in either the Coaches Poll or AP Poll until the 2012 season.

Schedule

References

Utah State
Utah State Aggies football seasons
Utah State Aggies football